Don Estaquio or Don Eustaquio Hofileña Memorial Elementary School is a public school in Silay City. It occupies a portion of the lot that was initially donated to Silay South Elementary School.

History 
The school opened in 1980 after the Silay City National High School had transferred beside it. The school started as an extension class of Silay South Elementary School with five teachers initially hired. In 1980, there was a move that made the school as an independent one, and was renamed to Don Eustaquio Hofileña Memorial Elementary School. The first principal was Mrs. Mutya Jaranilla Arceo. The school served as an alternative academe for excess classes and enrollment from other institutions like Silay North Elementary School, Silay South Elementary School and Governor Emilio Gaston Memorial Elementary School.

Present 
The buildings and rooms are old and mostly need repair, yet those are still usable. The school is painted with Orange and Yellow; the theme colors of the school.

See also 
 Silay South Elementary School
 Silay City
 Doña Montserrat Lopez Memorial High School
 St. Theresita's Academy
 Silay Institute

References

Schools in Silay
High schools in Negros Occidental
Public schools in the Philippines